Humphrey Township is one of eighteen townships in Platte County, Nebraska, United States. The population was 486 at the 2020 census. A 2021 estimate placed the township's population at 479.

A small portion of City of Humphrey lies within the Township.

History
Humphrey Township was established in 1872. It was named after Humphrey, New York.

See also
County government in Nebraska

References

External links
City-Data.com

Townships in Platte County, Nebraska
Townships in Nebraska